The Sauwald in Upper Austria is the largest part of the Bohemian Massif lying south of the Danube. Its plateau runs from Passau and Schärding on the Inn to Eferding.

Origin of the name: Passau Forest 
Folk etymologically the name is believed to have derived from the (formally native) wild boar, but the term is more probably an abbreviation of its old name, Passauer Wald ("Passau Forest"). The whole region was always closely linked to the Bishopric of Passau and the town of Passau.

References

External links 
 Regionalverband Sauwald
 Kulturprojekt Sauwald
 
 

 
Central Uplands
Forests and woodlands of Austria
Mountain ranges of Upper Austria
Regions of Upper Austria